

Shipboard systems
 Aegis combat system
 Ship Self-Defense System
 MK 45 5-inch gun
 Phalanx CIWS 
 RGM-84 Harpoon
 Naval Strike Missile
 AGM-158C LRASM
 BGM-109 Tomahawk 
 RIM-66 Standard (SM-1MR/SM-2MR)
 RIM-67 Standard (SM-1ER/SM-2ER)
 RIM-116 Rolling Airframe Missile
 RIM-161 Standard (SM-3)
 RIM-174 Standard (SM-6)
 RIM-162 Evolved Sea Sparrow Missile
 RUM-139 VL-ASROC
 Mark 46 torpedo
 Mark 48 torpedo
 Mark 50 torpedo
 Mark 54 torpedo
 Mark 60 Captor Mine
 Trident (D5) Ballistic missile

Aircraft systems
 M61 Vulcan
 AGM-84 Harpoon
 AGM-88 HARM
 AGM-65 Maverick
 AGM-119 Penguin
 AGM-154 Joint Standoff Weapon
 AIM-9 Sidewinder
 AIM-7 Sparrow
 AIM-120 AMRAAM
 AGM-84H/K SLAM-ER
 JDAM GPS-guided bombs
 Paveway laser-guided bombs
 CBU-100 Cluster Bomb
 B61 nuclear bomb
 Mark 82 dumb bomb
 Mk 77 incendiary bomb
 SCALPEL

See also
Electromagnetic Personnel Interdiction Control, prototype weapon

References
Globalsecurity.org Munitions section

Weapons
Weapons list
Naval weapons of the United States